A. Swayze & the Ghosts are an Australian band formed in 2017. They released their debut studio album Paid Salvation in September 2020.

A. Swayze & the Ghosts released their self-titled EP in 2017. Since then, they have become appeared at Splendour in the Grass, Falls Festival and Bigsound. They have also supported Jet, The Vines, Frank Carter & The Rattlesnakes and Total Control.

Discography

Studio albums

Extended plays

Singles

Awards and nominations

AIR Awards
The Australian Independent Record Awards (commonly known informally as AIR Awards) is an annual awards night to recognise, promote and celebrate the success of Australia's Independent Music sector.

! 
|-
| AIR Awards of 2021
| Paid Salvation
| Best Independent Punk Album or EP
| 
|

ARIA Music Awards
The ARIA Music Awards is an annual ceremony presented by Australian Recording Industry Association (ARIA), which recognise excellence, innovation, and achievement across all genres of the music of Australia. They commenced in 1987.

! 
|-
| 2021|| Paid Salvation || ARIA Award for Best Hard Rock or Heavy Metal Album || 
| 
|-

National Live Music Awards
The National Live Music Awards (NLMAs) are a broad recognition of Australia's diverse live industry, celebrating the success of the Australian live scene. The awards commenced in 2016.

! 
|-
| rowspan="3" | 2018
| rowspan="3" | A. Swayze & the Ghosts
| Best New Act
| 
| rowspan="3" | 
|-
| Best Live Act of the Year (People's Choice)
| 
|-
| Tasmanian Live Act of the Year 
| 
|-
| 2019
| A. Swayze & the Ghosts
| Tasmanian Live Act of the Year 
| 
| 
|-
| 2020
| A. Swayze & the Ghosts
| Tasmanian Live Act of the Year 
| 
| 
|-

References

Australian rock music groups
Tasmanian musical groups
Musical groups established in 2017
2017 establishments in Australia